The Herkelstein is a hill, 434.5 m, in the northeastern part of the der Eifel, in the German state of North Rhine-Westphalia. It forms the highest point of the Eschweiler Ridge and lies in the North Eifel Nature Park. Geologically the region is part of the Limestone Eifel, the Herkelstein itself - like the rock formations of the Kakus Caves - is made of Devonian Limestone. It lies between the villages of Weiler am Berge and Holzheim (Mechernich). From the top there is a good long-distance view over the Cologne Bay.

The vegetation on the Herkelstein comprises coniferous and mixed forest, pastures and arable fields.

At the foot of the Herkelstein rises the Krebsbach stream, which empties into the  Feybach at Breitenbenden.

Several years ago a number of lime kilns were discovered on the northeastern slopes of the Herkelstein near the village of Weiler am Berge.

Local recreation area 
There are several footpath and trails to the Herkelstein. The good views of the Jülich and Zülpich Börde are popular.

In winter the Herkelstein is a popular destination for tobogganists from the region. There are two slopes of different gradients, both are next to the Landesstraße L499.

External links 
Wanderung des Eifelvereins am Herkelstein
Wanderung Rund um den Herkelstein

Mountains and hills of the Eifel
Mountains and hills of North Rhine-Westphalia
Euskirchen (district)
History of the Eifel